Pine Hills Adventist Academy is a private Seventh-Day Adventist K-12 Christian school founded and established in 1941 in Auburn, California. It is a part of the Seventh-day Adventist education system, the world's second largest Christian school system.

Curriculum
The schools curriculum consists primarily of the standard courses taught at college preparatory schools across the world. All students are required to take classes in the core areas of English, Basic Sciences, Mathematics, a Foreign Language, and Social Sciences.

Spiritual aspects
All students take religion classes each year that they are enrolled. These classes cover topics in biblical history and Christian and denominational doctrines. Instructors in other disciplines also begin each class period with prayer or a short devotional thought, many which encourage student input. Weekly, the entire student body gathers together in their gymnasium for a chapel service.
Outside the classrooms there is year-round spiritually oriented programming that relies on student involvement.

Sports
Pine Hills offer a variety of sports:
Flag Football, Volleyball, and Basketball(both guys' and girls')

Time Keeper
The Time Keeper is the official yearbook of Pine Hills Adventist Academy.

See also

 List of Seventh-day Adventist secondary schools
 Seventh-day Adventist education

References

Schools in Placer County, California
Auburn, California
Christian schools in California
Adventist secondary schools in the United States
Private elementary schools in California
Private middle schools in California
Private high schools in California
High schools in Placer County, California
Educational institutions established in 1941
1941 establishments in California